Oliver Ekroth (born 18 January 1992) is a Swedish football defender who plays for Icelandic club Víkingur.

Club career
On 25 February 2022, Ekroth signed with Víkingur in Iceland.

References

1992 births
Living people
Swedish footballers
Association football defenders
Oskarshamns AIK players
Sandvikens IF players
Västerås SK Fotboll players
Kristianstad FC players
Degerfors IF players
Knattspyrnufélagið Víkingur players
Ettan Fotboll players
Superettan players
Allsvenskan players
Swedish expatriate footballers
Expatriate footballers in Iceland
Swedish expatriate sportspeople in Iceland